The 2017 Italian Athletics Championships was the 107th edition of the Italian Athletics Championships and were held in Trieste on 30 June to 1 July 2017.

Champions

See also
2017 Italian Athletics Indoor Championships

References

External links
 All results at FIDAL web site

Italian Athletics Championships
Athletics
Italian Athletics Outdoor Championships
Athletics competitions in Italy